, abbreviated as BRII, is a 2003 Japanese dystopian action film and a sequel to the 2000 film Battle Royale, which in turn was based upon a controversial 1999 novel of the same title by Koushun Takami. A novelization of the film was written by McKoy Sugie.

Director Kinji Fukasaku, who helmed the original, started production but died of prostate cancer on 12 January 2003, after shooting only one scene with Takeshi Kitano. His son Kenta Fukasaku, who wrote the screenplay for both films, completed it in his directorial debut and dedicated it to his father. Unlike the first film, Requiem is an original story. It is set three years after the events of the original film and follows Shuya Nanahara, who has now become an international terrorist intending to bring down the Japanese government. As a result, another class of ninth graders is kidnapped and sent to eliminate Nanahara within a limited time period of 72 hours.

The film was released in Japanese cinemas on 5 July 2003. In stark contrast to its predecessor, it drew largely negative responses from critics. In 2009, an extended version entitled Revenge, which runs 20 minutes longer than the theatrical cut, was released on DVD. It included additional action, improved effects, slow motion shots, new score in several scenes and extended storyline.

Plot
Three years after the events of the first film, the survivors of previous Battles Royale have formed a rebel group called the Wild Seven, led by Shuya Nanahara. A class of ninth graders, composed of "a ragtag collection of delinquents and losers", are tricked into going onto a "field trip" and then kidnapped by the authoritarian Japanese government. Many of these students are orphans whose parents or family died in bombings by the Wild Seven. After their school bus is diverted to an army base, the students are herded into a cage, surrounded by armed guards, and confronted by their schoolteacher, Riki Takeuchi, who lays down the ground rules of the new Battle Royale game.

Instead of being forced to kill each other, as in the old Battle Royale, the students are sent off to war and ordered to attack the Wild Seven's island hideout en masse and kill Shuya within 72 hours. Most of the students are not interested in being forced to avenge their families, but they are coerced to fight through exploding metal collars, which their captors can detonate by remote control. The students are put into "pairs"; if one student dies, then his or her partner will be killed via collar detonation. Takeuchi shows them a line in the caged classroom: those who wish to participate are instructed to cross the line, while those who refuse to participate will face consequences. All students but one agree to participate. The one student who did not agree was shot in the leg and killed by the schoolteacher. His partner is then killed by her collar detonating.

The students are sent via boats onto the island base of the Wild Seven. A number of them are killed when they are bombed, shot, or have their collars detonated during the journey, leaving only a cluster alive. Two of the survivors are a delinquent, Takuma Aoi; and Shiori Kitano, the daughter of the "teacher" of a Battle Royale program who was killed by Shuya three years previously. Taken into the Wild Seven's base, the surviving students' explosive collars are removed and they are encouraged to help the Wild Seven end the Battle Royale for good. While most of the survivors agree, Takuma and Shiori remain unconvinced.

On Christmas Day, Shuya sends a video message to the world stating their goal to live free. In response to the video, the United States fires a missile upon the island, interrupting the students and the Wild Seven. Under pressure from the U.S. government, the Japanese prime minister takes command of the military present at the Battle Royale headquarters and orders an attack on the Wild Seven's base, with no survivors allowed – if they fail, the U.S. will bomb the island. Takeuchi is enraged by the change of actions and is discovered to have the same type of collar on his neck as the students.

The survivors of the base (including the surviving students, except Shiori) retreat to the mainland via a mine shaft while the war between the Wild Seven and the military occurs. Hearing the gunfire outside the tunnel, Takuma and two of his friends return to help in the fight. The combat takes numerous casualties on both sides, leaving Shuya, Takuma, and Shiori as the only remaining fighters. While they try to evacuate, Takeuchi appears and, after a brief personal exchange, allows the group to flee as he sacrifices himself.

Outside Wild Seven's base, the combat starts again and Shiori is mortally wounded by gunfire. Before she dies in Shuya's arms, she reveals herself as Kitano's daughter and seemingly forgives him for his past crimes. Shuya and Takuma run out to kill the rest of the soldiers while the U.S. bombardment begins. The program then ends on a voided status, listing the fates of Shuya and the surviving students as unknown. Three months later, Shuya and Takuma rejoin the other survivors, including Noriko Nakagawa, in Afghanistan. They have regrouped as friends, and what lies next for them remains unknown.

Cast

 Tatsuya Fujiwara as Shuya Nanahara
 Ai Maeda as Shiori Kitano (Transfer Student)
 Shugo Oshinari as Takuma Aoi
 Ayana Sakai as Nao Asakura
 Haruka Suenaga as Haruka Kuze  
 Yuma Ishigaki as Mitsugu Sakai
 Miyuki Kanbe as Kyoko Kakei
 Nana Yanagisawa as Mayu Hasuda
 Masaya Kikawada as Shintaro Makimura
 Yōko Maki as Maki Souda
 Yuki Ito as Ryo Kurosawa
 Natsuki Kato as Saki Sakurai
 Aki Maeda as Noriko Nakagawa
 Riki Takeuchi as Riki Takeuchi
 Sonny Chiba as Makio Mimura (Shinji's revolutionary uncle)
 Ai Iwamura as Mai (Smiling Winner from BR1)
 Mika Kikuchi as Ayane Yagi
 Takeshi Kitano as Kitano
 Yoshiko Mita as Takuma's mother
 Nanami Ohta as Hitoe Takeuchi
 Takeru Shibaki as Shugo Urabe
 Toshiyuki Toyonaga as Shota Hikasa
 Masahiko Tsugawa as The Prime Minister

Production
Kenta Fukasaku said, "We never set out to make Harry Potter." He explains that he wanted audience members to ponder "big issues" and to view the world from a point of view held by a terrorist. Fukasaku added that the film, against "the new Matrix" and Terminator III, needed to "provide something that Hollywood can't." Fukasaku intended to provide an alternative to what Time magazine's Ilya Garger describes as "the moral certainty of American culture" as seen in U.S. films and foreign policy.

Kenta Fukasaku said that he viewed his task as finishing his deceased father's movie instead of as directing his first creation; the son credits the film as his father's. Kenta Fukasaku desired a lot of controversy and outrage for the sequel, adding that "the more strongly people react, the better." The film was mainly shot on Hashima Island ("Battleship Island").

Reception
Requiem received generally negative reviews from film critics. The film received a rating of 30% at Rotten Tomatoes with a classification of "rotten", based on ten reviews. Many of the reviewers criticized the film for being inferior to the original, having a contrived, confusing plot line, its controversial, provocative sentiments, and generally bad acting.

Ilya Garger of Time said that while the film has more "bullets, bombs and dramatic battlefield deaths" than its predecessor had, the sequel does not have the "who'll-die-next-and-how suspense." Garger described the characters in Battle Royale II as "a simpler breed" who join forces to defeat the adults. One of the few positive reviews was from Jamie Russell of BBC who stated that the film "scrapes by on the strength of its startlingly subversive political commentary," wearing "its anti-American sentiments on its sleeve." Despite criticizing it for being "torturously overlong, resoundingly clunky and full of a bloated sense of its own importance," it concluded that "its decision to cast its heroes as teenage Al Qaeda-style terrorists fighting against a fascistic adult America is staggeringly bold."

Music
The sequel's soundtrack has more original work by Masamichi Amano and fewer classical pieces. One of them, Farewell to the Piano, is played by Shiori Kitano herself during the film.

The song from the opening credits is "Dies Irae", taken from the Verdi Requiem.

The end title song is by the Japanese punk band Stance Punks. The song "Mayonaka Shounen Totsugeki Dan" features on their first full-length, self-titled album.

Books
The book The Road to BRII is a behind-the-scenes photo collection about the production of the movie. About ten tie-in books related to the movie have been released in Japan.

Related manga
A manga series called Battle Royale II: Blitz Royale is partially related to Battle Royale II: Requiem. The school in Blitz Royale is Shikanotoride Junior High School, and the "teacher" pops pills like Riki Takeuchi. There are numerous plot differences between the film and manga.

References

External links

 
 
 Comparison of DVD releases

Battle Royale (franchise)
Films about teenagers
2003 films
2003 action thriller films
2000s Christmas films
Battle royale
Japanese action thriller films
Japanese Christmas films
Japanese coming-of-age films
2000s Japanese-language films
2000s dystopian films
Films about death games
Films about orphans
Films about terrorism in Asia
Films directed by Kenta Fukasaku
Films directed by Kinji Fukasaku
Films set in Afghanistan
Films set in Tokyo
Films set on islands
Toei Company films
Films about juvenile delinquency
Japanese sequel films
Films scored by Masamichi Amano
2000s Japanese films